Country School is a 1931 short film.

Country School may also refer to:

Country School, a K–3 elementary school in Weston, Massachusetts
New Canaan Country School, a Preschool–9 private school in New Canaan, Connecticut

See also
One-room school